Caloptilia palustriella is a moth of the family Gracillariidae. It is known from California, United States.

The larvae feed on Salix species, including Salix lasiolepis. They mine the leaves of their host plant.

References

External links
mothphotographersgroup

palustriella
Moths of North America
Moths described in 1910